The 2012 Big Sky Conference men's basketball tournament began on March 3 and continued through March 7. The regular-season champion Montana Grizzlies won the tournament and with it an automatic bid to the NCAA tournament.

Unlike many NCAA Division I conferences, the Big Sky does not invite all of its teams to its postseason tournament—only the top six teams in regular-season play qualify. The top two teams receive a bye into the semifinals, and the field is reseeded after the first round so that the 1 seed plays the lowest remaining seed.

The tournament's first round, involving the 3 through 6 seeds, was played on campus sites, specifically the home arenas of the 3 and 4 seeds—respectively the Peter Stott Center in Portland, Oregon, home to the Portland State Vikings, and Reese Court in Cheney, Washington, home to the Eastern Washington Eagles. The semifinals and championship were at Montana's home of Dahlberg Arena in Missoula.

Bracket

First round games at campus sites of lower-numbered seeds 
Semifinals and Championship game hosted by Montana

References

Tournament
Big Sky Conference men's basketball tournament
College sports tournaments in Montana
Basketball competitions in Missoula, Montana
Big Sky Conference men's basketball tournament
Big Sky Conference men's basketball tournament